The Apertura 2015 Copa MX was the 74th staging of the Copa MX, the 47th staging in the professional era and is the seventh tournament played since the 1996–97 edition.

This tournament began on July 28, 2015 and ended November 4, 2015. The winner will face the winner of the Clausura 2016 edition, in the 2016 Supercopa MX for the right to qualify as Mexico 3 to the 2017 Copa Libertadores.

Guadalajara won their third title after defeating León 1–0 in the final.

Participants
This tournament featured clubs from Liga MX who did not participate in the 2015-16 CONCACAF Champions League (América, Querétaro, Santos Laguna and UANL) All Ascenso MX teams except FC Juárez and Sonora also participated, no official reason was given for the clubs' exclusion from the tournament.

Tiebreakers

If two or more clubs are equal on points on completion of the group matches, the following criteria are applied to determine the rankings:

 superior goal difference;
 higher number of goals scored;
 scores of the group matches played among the clubs in question;
 higher number of goals scored away in the group matches played among the clubs in question;
 best position in the Relegation table;
 fair play ranking;
 drawing of lots.

Group stage

Every group is composed by four clubs, two from Liga MX and two from Ascenso MX. Instead of a traditional robin-round schedule, the clubs will play in three two-legged "rounds", the last one being contested by clubs of the same league.

Each win gives a club 3 points, each draw gives 1 point. An extra point is awarded for every round won; a round is won by aggregated score, and if it is a tie, the extra point will be awarded to the team with higher number of goals scored away.

All times are UTC−06:00 except for matches in Sinaloa, Tepic (both UTC−07:00) and Tijuana (UTC−08:00)

Group 1

Round 1

Atlante won the round 4–3 on aggregate

Teams tied 1–1 on aggregate and both tied on away goals, thus neither team received the extra point

Round 2

Cruz Azul won the round 3–0 on aggregate

Pachuca won the round 4–2 on aggregate

Round 3

Atlante won the round 2–0 on aggregate

Teams drew 3–3 on aggregate, Pachuca won the round on away goals

Group 2

Round 1

León won the round 5–4 on aggregate

Monterrey won the round 4–1 on aggregate

Round 2

León won the round 5–2 on aggregate

Atlético San Luis won the round 3–2 on aggregate

Round 3

Atlético San Luis won the round 4–3 on aggregate

León won the round 7–3 on aggregate

Group 3

Round 1

Oaxaca won the round 3–2 on aggregate

Chiapas won the round 3–2 on aggregate

Round 2

UNAM won the round 3–2 on aggregate

Oaxaca won the round 5–3 on aggregate

Round 3

Oaxaca won the round 3–2 on aggregate

Teams drew 4–4 on aggregate, Chiapas won the round on away goals

Group 4

Round 1

Guadalajara won the round 3–0 on aggregate

Morelia won the round 3–2 on aggregate

Round 2

Guadalajara won the round 2–1 on aggregate

Morelia won the round 2–1 on aggregate

Round 3

Zacatecas won the round 2–1 on aggregate

Teams drew 2–2 on aggregate, Guadalajara won the round on away goals

Group 5

Round 1

Tijuana won the round 4–2 on aggregate

Toluca won the round 5–3 on aggregate

Round 2

Tijuana won the round 6–4 on aggregate

Toluca won the round 4–2 on aggregate

Round 3

Zacatepec won the round 6–5 on aggregate

Toluca won the round 5–2 on aggregate

Group 6

Round 1

Atlas won the round 1–0 on aggregate

Murciélagos won the round 3–1 on aggregate

Round 2

Sinaloa won the round 5–1 on aggregate

Atlas won the round 4–1 on aggregate

Round 3

U. de G. won the round 3–1 on aggregate

Teams drew 1–1 on aggregate and drew on away goals, thus neither team received the extra point

Group 7

Round 1

Veracruz won the round 4–1 on aggregate

Puebla won the round 2–0 on aggregate

Round 2

BUAP won the round 5–1 on aggregate

Veracruz won the round 3–2 on aggregate

Round 3

BUAP won the round 4–1 on aggregate

Teams drew 0–0 on aggregate and drew on away goals, thus neither team received the extra point

Ranking of runners-up clubs

The best runner-up advance to the Championship Stage. If two or more teams are equal on points on completion of the group matches, the following criteria are applied to determine the rankings:

 superior goal difference;
 higher number of goals scored;
 higher number of goals scored away;
 best position in the Relegation table;
 fair play ranking;
 drawing of lots.

Championship stage

The eight clubs that advance to this stage were ranked and seeded 1 to 8 based on performance in the group stage. In case of ties, the same tiebreakers used to rank the runners-up were used.
In this stage, all the rounds will be a one-off match. If a game ends in a draw, it will proceed directly to a penalty shoot-out. The highest seeded club will host each match, regardless of which division each club belongs.

Seeding

Bracket

Quarterfinals

Semifinals

Final

Top goalscorers

Source: LaCopaMX.net

References

External links
Official site

2015, 1
Copa Mx, 1
Copa Mx, 1